The Copyright Act 1987 (Malaysia), is a Malaysian law which was enacted to make better provisions in the law relating to copyright in Malaysia and for other matters connected therewith. It repealed the Imperial Copyright Act of 1911 which was the copyright law used in British Malaya as well as throughout the British Empire in its heyday.

Structure
The Copyright Act 1987, in its current form (1 July 2012), consists of 8 parts containing 61 sections and no schedule (including 9 amendments).
 Part I: Preliminary
 Part II: General Provisions
 Part III: Nature and Duration of Copyright 
 Part IV: Ownership and Assignment of Copyright
 Part IVA: Copyright Licensing
 Part V: Copyright Tribunal
 Part VI: Remedies for Infringements and Offences
 Part VIA: Anti-Camcording
 Part VIB: Limitation of Liabilities of the Service Provider
 Part VII: Enforcement
 Part VIII: Miscellaneous

See also
Copyright Act

References

External links
 Copyright Act 1987 

1987 in Malaysian law
Malaysian federal legislation
Malaysian copyright law